Willard Harvey Gildersleeve (September 17, 1886 – July 19, 1976) was an American college football coach. He served as the head coach at the New Hampshire College of Agriculture and the Mechanic Arts, Massachusetts Agricultural College, and Westminster College.

Early life and college
Gildersleeve was born on September 17, 1886 in Gildersleeve, Connecticut. He graduated from Middletown High School in 1903, and attended college at Wesleyan University, where he played baseball and football. The Meriden Daily Record called him a "star" athlete at Wesleyan. He graduated with a B.S. in 1908. He then undertook postgraduate studies at Harvard Summer School of physical training from 1909 to 1910. Gildersleeve served as the "physical director" at St. Lawrence University during that same time.

Coaching career
Gildersleeve coached at New Hampshire in 1909 and amassed a 3–4 record. He coached the 1910 Massachusetts Aggies (now known as the UMass Minutemen) and amassed a 1–6–2 record. He then coached Westminster in 1911 and amassed a 2–4–1 record. On October 7, 1911, he was arrested after a brawl erupted during the game against Pittsburgh. The Pittsburgh Gazette Times criticized the law enforcement response in the incident:"The arrest of Gildersleeve appeared ridiculous, in that he was the only one of the crowd taken by the police. He is a small man and two big policemen grabbed him and took him across the field in full view of the crowd. The police acted as though Gildersleeve was a desperate criminal. This act failed to make a hit with the crowd, who were inclined to poke fun at the police for their brave act."

In 1913, Meriden High School hired Gildersleeve as a teacher and head football coach. He also coached baseball at the school. In 1917, he coached baseball at Hyannis High School, and in his one season tenure, guided the team to the Cape Cod High School Championship.

Personal life
Gildersleeve married Gertrude Isabell née Sugden in 1909, and as of 1921, the couple had two children, a son and a daughter. He wrote extensively on genealogy, and in 1914, authored a book on his own family titled Gildersleeves of Gildersleeve, Conn. and the Descendants of Philip Gildersleeve. In the foreword he noted, "Ignorance of one's family is inexcusable and a source of future trouble. The family is the key of all progress, of all permanent success."

During the 1930s, he wrote to a number of distant Gildersleeve cousins to share his knowledge of their common ancestors, Richard Gildersleeve and his wife Joanna, pioneers who arrived at Boston in 1634 on a ship of the Winthrop line, and of their descendants. In 1941, he published Gildersleeve Pioneers, "a series of sketches and biographies, with an appendix of lineages", beginning with their pioneer ancestor, Richard Gildersleeve.

He died in July 1976 at the age of 89 in Wayne, New Jersey. He is interred at the Portland Burial Ground in Portland, Connecticut.

Head coaching record

College

Notes

References

External links
 

1886 births
1976 deaths
New Hampshire Wildcats football coaches
St. Lawrence Saints athletic directors
UMass Minutemen football coaches
Wesleyan Cardinals baseball players
Wesleyan Cardinals football players
Westminster Titans football coaches
High school baseball coaches in the United States
High school football coaches in Connecticut
High school football coaches in Massachusetts
Harvard Summer School alumni
People from Portland, Connecticut
Players of American football from Connecticut
Coaches of American football from Connecticut